Marco Franco (born October 6, 1991) is an American soccer player who plays as a defender.

Career

Youth & College
Franco played four years of college soccer at UC Irvine between 2010 and 2013. While at college, Franco also appeared for USL PDL club's Orange County Blue Star and OC Blues Strikers FC in 2012 and 2013 respectively.

Professional
On January 16, 2014, Franco was selected 13th overall in the 2014 MLS SuperDraft by Chicago Fire.

Franco was loaned to USL Pro club Orange County Blues on August 8, 2014.

In September 2014, Franco joined NASL side Indy Eleven on loan.

References

External links 

1991 births
Living people
American soccer players
Association football defenders
Chicago Fire FC draft picks
Chicago Fire FC players
Indy Eleven players
North American Soccer League players
OC Pateadores Blues players
Orange County Blue Star players
Orange County SC players
Penn FC players
Miami FC players
People from Chino Hills, California
Soccer players from California
Sportspeople from San Bernardino County, California
UC Irvine Anteaters men's soccer players
USL Championship players
USL League Two players
National Independent Soccer Association players